The HSC Champion Jet 2 is an  fast catamaran ferry owned by Greek ferry firm Seajets.
Between 1997 and early 2015, she was operated by Condor Ferries and ran between the UK and the Channel Islands as Condor Express .

History

Condor Express was built in 1996 at the Incat Yards in Tasmania, Australia for use by Condor Ferries then joint owned by Commodore Shipping of Guernsey and Holyman.  Condor Express was the first of a series of four 86m catamarans.

Condor Express arrived in her home waters from her builders in January 1997 and was opened to the public in Poole before taking up service between Weymouth and the Channel Islands later that month replacing Condor 12.  On 1 March 1997, Condor Express opened the Poole-Channel Islands service for Condor Ferries after operating what was planned to be the last sailing from Weymouth for the company the day before.  Condor Express first year in service was marred by a series of technical problems resulting in delays and cancellation of what was now the only car and passenger ferry service to the Channel Islands.  As a result of these problems the governments of Guernsey and Jersey put the licence to operate the service to the United Kingdom out to tender.  Condor Express engines were subsequently modified along with those of her sister ships and she provided a more reliable service between the UK and the Channel Islands based in Weymouth year round with seasonal services from Poole.  As part of a bid to improve service as part of the tender agreement Condor Express and her sister  were fitted with a Club Lounge and an area of reclining seats.

Condor Express received an updated version of the Condor Ferries livery in 2003.

In August 2005 Condor Express briefly ran on the Brittany Ferries Poole-Cherbourg service. She had been experiencing technical problems and so Condor Vitesse was transferred to the more taxing Channel Islands service. During this time Condor Express did not sail to St Malo, instead running an afternoon round trip to Cherbourg to ensure she would return to Poole in time for the 07:30 Brittany Ferries departure time.  Condor Express ran once again for Brittany Ferries on 19 May 2008.

On 14 January 2015, it was announced that she would be sold to Greek firm Seajets for an undisclosed sum with her sister-ship HSC Condor Vitesse, owing to her replacement by HSC Condor Liberation. She was delivered after the introduction of new HSC Condor Liberation to her new owner, who renamed her HSC Champion Jet 2.

Regular routes

Champion Jet 2 operates routes from Piraeus or Heraklion to the Greek islands:

Currently operating 

Piraeus-Serifos-Sifnos-Milos-Sifnos-Serifos-Piraeus

Apr - June 2022
Piraeus-Syros-Mykonos-Naxos-Ios-santorini-Naxos-Mykonos-Syros-Pireaus

May - Oct 2021
Piraeus-Serifos-Sifnos-Milos-Sifnos-Serifos-Piraeus

2020
Piraeus-Mykonos-Naxos-Thira-Naxos-Mykonos-Pireaus
Heraklion-Thira-Ios-Naxos-Mykonos-Paros-Naxos-Thira-Heraklion
Rethymno-Thira-Rethymno

Sister ships
Tarifa Jet
Champion Jet 1
Condor Rapide /

External links
 86 Metre Wave Piercing Catamaran from incat
 Condor Ferries official site

Ships of Seajets
Ships built by Incat
Ferries of England
Ferries of Jersey
Ferries of Guernsey
Ferries of Greece
Incat high-speed craft
1996 ships